Henry William Dowd (4 July 1938 – 7 April 2015) was an English football goalkeeper who played for Manchester City, Stoke City and Oldham Athletic.

Career
At the start of his career Dowd combined amateur football playing for ICI Blackley with a job as a plumber. On 10 January 1958 he signed for Manchester City as an amateur, and turned professional two years later. In December 1961 he made his debut in a 4–1 defeat to Blackburn Rovers, deputising for the injured Bert Trautmann. In the 1961–62 season he established himself as first choice goalkeeper, making 34 appearances. In February 1964, Dowd broke his finger in a game against Bury. Unable to continue playing in goal, he moved to centre-forward, where he scored the equalising goal.

During Manchester City's championship winning 1967–68 season, Dowd lost his first team place through injury to Ken Mulhearn, and made only seven first team appearances therefore missing out on a League Championship Medal under the rules then in place. He regained his place the following season, and played on the winning side in the 1969 FA Cup final, where Manchester City beat Leicester City 1–0.

In the 1969–70 season, Dowd lost his first team place again, this time to Joe Corrigan and so the spent two months on loan at Stoke City being used as cover for Gordon Banks, making three appearances for the "Potters". His final Manchester City appearance was against Sheffield Wednesday in the final match of 1969–70, and in December 1970 he was transferred to Oldham Athletic, where he played 111 times. Dowd died on 7 April 2015 at the age of 76.

Career statistics
Source:

Honours
Manchester City
 Second Division Title winner: 1965/66
 First Division Title winner: 1967/68
 FA Cup winner: 1969

References
 Specific

 General
 
 

1938 births
2015 deaths
Manchester City F.C. players
Oldham Athletic A.F.C. players
Stoke City F.C. players
English footballers
Footballers from Salford
Association football goalkeepers
English Football League players
Northwich Victoria F.C. players
FA Cup Final players